Donald Colin (Pablo) Mackenzie (born May 27, 1931) is a retired Canadian Forces Air Command general. He served as deputy commander of NORAD from 1983 to 1986. He is an alumnus of the University of Alberta, earning a Bachelor of Commerce degree in 1959. He also earned an honorary doctorate of Law. In 2003, he received a University of Alberta Alumni Association's Distinguished Alumni Award. Mackenzie has also served on the board of directors of PanAmerican Beverages Inc.

References

|-

|-

Canadian Forces Air Command generals
1931 births
Living people